Pakboys Takusa is a 2020 Philippine comedy film produced by Viva Films starring Janno Gibbs, Dennis Padilla, Andrew E, and Jerald Napoles. Directed by Al Tantay. It is one of the official entries of the 2020 Metro Manila Film Festival. The film was premiered on December 25, 2020.

The term "Takusa" is a contraction of the Filipino phrase takot sa asawa or "fear of one's spouse".

Plot 
A group of middle-aged men with their acts of unfaithfulness, shows how they attempt to acquire back their wives' trust.

Cast 

 Janno Gibbs as Justine
 Dennis Padilla as Bruno
 Jerald Napoles as Drake
 Andrew E as Dr. John Bartolome
 Ana Roces as Arianna "Tart" Bartolome
 Angelu de Leon as Selina
 Maui Taylor as Miley
 Nathalie Hart as Natasha
 Leo Martinez as Bernardo
 Marissa Sanchez as Kate
 Sheree
 Gary Lim as Joko
 Gene Padilla
 Francine Garcia

Marketing
Pakboys Takusa was reportedly under production as early as January 2020 under the working title VIVA HQ for the look test & storycon of CONDO/PAKBOYS The Movie.

The trailer for Pakboys Takusa was released on November 26, 2020, which had at least 23.7 million accumulated views as of December 2, 2020.

Pakboys Takusa received negative reception online for its trailer. Miss Trans Global 2020 pageant winner, actress and transgender rights activist Mela Franco Habijan on her part was critical of the film's "slapstick, LGBTQIA-phobic comedy". Habijan cited certain scenes which portrayed a transgender woman peeing while standing and how Padilla's character was bothered sleeping with the same woman as comedic at the expense of the transgender community. She called for the film's disqualification from the 2020 Metro Manila Film Festival.

The starring actors of the film responded to the controversy arising from the trailer. Napoles on his part pointed out the whole film did not release yet and asked potential audience and critics to watch the whole scene for its context. Andrew E. said that the actress who played transgender, Francine Garcia a transgender herself and the winner of Eat Bulaga!'''s LGBT pageant segment Super Sireyna 2013, enjoyed her role in Pakboys and did not have any complaints regarding the film. Gibbs apologized for the backlash, but added that the film is not a film with "political correctness" or "life lessons but a straight-out comedy.

 Release 
This will serve for Dennis Padilla, Andrew E, Janno Gibbs, and Al Tantay as their second collaboration in a film after Sanggano, Sanggago't Sanggwapo'' which was released in 2019. The film was premiered on December 25, 2020, via online platform UpStream, as one of the official ten entries of the 2020 Metro Manila Film Festival.

References

External links 

 

2020 films
2020s Christmas comedy films
Philippine Christmas comedy films
2020 comedy films
Films not released in theaters due to the COVID-19 pandemic
Films directed by Al Tantay